Eva Maria Joann Janssens (born 16 July 1996) is a German badminton player. In 2015, she won gold and bronze medals at the European Junior Badminton Championships in mixed & girls' doubles events.

Achievements

European Junior Championships 
Girls' doubles

Mixed doubles

BWF Grand Prix (1 title) 
The BWF Grand Prix had two levels, the Grand Prix and Grand Prix Gold. It was a series of badminton tournaments sanctioned by the Badminton World Federation (BWF) and played between 2007 and 2017.

Women's doubles

  BWF Grand Prix Gold tournament
  BWF Grand Prix tournament

BWF International Challenge/Series (4 runners-up) 
Women's doubles

Mixed doubles

  BWF International Challenge tournament
  BWF International Series tournament
  BWF Future Series tournament

References

External links 
 

1996 births
Living people
Sportspeople from Aachen
German female badminton players